James Mitchell "Mike" DeBardeleben Jr. (March 20, 1940 – January 26, 2011) was an American convicted kidnapper, rapist, counterfeiter, and suspected serial killer who became known as the "Mall Passer" due to his practice of passing counterfeit bills in shopping malls bordering interstate highways across the United States.

After his arrest for counterfeiting, the Secret Service found evidence linking him to much more serious sex crimes. He was sentenced to 375 years in federal prison. Although he was never brought to trial for murder, he was the principal suspect in two homicides and he remains a suspect in several others. He died of pneumonia at the Federal Medical Center in Butner, North Carolina, in early 2011. DeBardeleben, said FBI profiler Roy Hazelwood, was the best-documented sexual sadist since the Marquis de Sade, and one of America's most dangerous known criminals.

Background
DeBardeleben was born in March 1940 in Little Rock, Arkansas, the second of three children born to James Mitchell DeBardeleben Sr. and Mary Lou Edwards DeBardeleben. The DeBardelebens were a military family who moved frequently. After the attack on Pearl Harbor, James DeBardeleben Sr. took a commission as a lieutenant in the United States Army, and was posted to Washington, D.C., for the duration of World War II. Mike's younger brother Ralph later became a U.S. Army paratrooper.

In 1945, the family moved to Austin, Texas, and James Sr. was shipped out to the South Pacific for nine months. In 1949, the family moved briefly to Kentucky before relocating to Frankfurt, Germany. In 1950, James Sr. was promoted to lieutenant colonel, and the family moved to the Hague in the Netherlands, where James Sr. served for two years as a military adviser for the U.S. Embassy. In 1953, James Sr. retired from the army, and took a federal civil service post in Albany, New York.

The marriage between DeBardeleben's parents was unstable and chaotic and both had many extramarital affairs. At one point, his parents had considered divorce as a result of these affairs, but ultimately chose to stay married for the sake of the children. DeBardeleben's mother was a sexually promiscuous and emotionally unstable alcoholic, whose behavior could become violent at times. His mother often neglected the children when her husband was away, preferring to spend much of her time at the bars drinking and picking up men. Mike's sister, Linda, became a caretaker for her younger brothers. It was during this period that DeBardeleben began to develop a deep hatred of his mother, which would eventually crystallize into a hatred of women in general.

As a child, DeBardeleben was subjected to considerable abuse and neglect by both his mother and father. His father was a punitive man who was very critical of his children and almost never praised them for their accomplishments. When DeBardeleben was younger, his father would punish him by holding his head underwater in a bathtub as well as switching him. According to his siblings, these punishments began before he was old enough to attend school.

Even from an early age, DeBardeleben was a quiet loner, detached from the other children. According to his own account and that of his sister, he preferred solitary activities and spent a great deal of time drawing and sketching in his room. These sorts of activities became an escape for him and a way to express himself, from which he "derived much inner satisfaction".

In adolescence, DeBardeleben began to exhibit antisocial behavior and aggressiveness toward others. In 1956, at the age of 16, DeBardeleben physically assaulted his mother for the first time. He is also alleged to have threatened his mother at times with a hatchet or a letter opener. On September 8 of that year, he purchased two handguns and ammunition with a friend. Later that month, he was arrested and convicted of his first felony, possessing a concealed firearm. This arrest was the first of many that followed, on sodomy, attempted murder, kidnapping, and other charges.

Adult life and death

In the spring of 1957, DeBardeleben was expelled from Peter Schuyler High School, which effectively ended his formal education. In October of that year, he enlisted in the U.S. Air Force and was stationed at the Lackland Air Force Base in Texas. After only a year, he was court-martialed for disorderly behavior and sentenced to two months in the base stockade. In 1958, he was ordered to see a psychiatrist for counseling after he was pronounced AWOL several times. At the age of eighteen, he was discharged from the Air Force and moved in with relatives in Fort Worth, Texas.

In 1959, DeBardeleben attempted school again, enrolling in R. L. Paschal High School, but after three months was expelled. In August of that year, he married his first wife, Linda Weir, but three weeks later separated from her. Also that month, he was arrested for attempted robbery with an accomplice, followed two weeks later by his involvement in a string of auto thefts, and was sentenced to five years' probation. In October, he fathered a premature stillborn daughter with an unidentified woman.

DeBardeleben later met Charlotte Weber, who was seventeen at the time he started courting her. At the time, DeBardeleben lived at home with his parents, terrorising his family. Both of his parents feared him and deemed him capable of killing them. Weber recalls how DeBardeleben's family endured violent outbursts in which he "lit fires in his room" and "kicked doors in". Nonetheless, Weber described DeBardeleben as a "handsome young rebel" with whom she was "enthralled".

In March 1960, he impregnated Charlotte and on June 9 the same year, married her. On December 12, 1960, he fathered a daughter, Bethene. Charlotte described him as preoccupied with vanity and being cold and detached but not abusive. Later wives described how DeBardeleben tortured and abused them. DeBardeleben fathered a second child with Charlotte, but was forced by her parents to give the child up for adoption. In August 1961, his 19-year-old brother Ralph, who was home on leave from the Army but staying in a motel due to an argument with DeBardeleben, committed suicide in a church parking lot by asphyxiating himself with his car exhaust.  He had stated to his sister that he intended not to return when his leave was up; DeBardeleben later blamed his brother's suicide on severe depression arising from rigorous paratrooper training, a girlfriend rejecting him, and, as the underlying cause, the same deprived home environment that he claimed created him. 

DeBardeleben attended two different universities in Texas in the summer of 1961 despite lacking a high school diploma, soon after divorcing Charlotte. But the following year, his probation was revoked, and he was put behind bars. DeBardeleben moved back in with his parents after being released, and he immediately started violently beating his mother, whom he called "Moe," once more. His health started to deteriorate at this point, and he started acting more aggressively. He read a variety of psychological books as a diversion. DeBardeleben was brought to Western State Hospital in Staunton, Virginia for a psychological assessment in March 1964 after his parents alerted the authorities out of concern that he could kill them. DeBardeleben was later labelled as "sociopathic" and "antisocial." Clinicians opined that his antisocial personality would render him a poor candidate for psychotherapy and that the safest place for him to be was in jail.

DeBardeleben began seeing Wanda Faye Davis, who was six years younger than him, soon after they met. The two eventually were married in September 1964. Later, she would describe him as charming, well-groomed, and intelligent. Ultimately, DeBardeleben got Davis to agree to having naked pictures taken of her engaging a variety of sadistic sex acts with him. Later, he used these to threaten her into helping him commit various crimes as his accomplice. DeBardeleben disclosed his grotesque sexual fantasies and openly discussed his urges to torture and kill women to Davis. Davis later told the Secret Service; "His greatest thing that he could have ever thought about was to abduct a woman, torture her, have various sex-activities go on, strangle her and watch her die or blow her brains out with a gun. Then he would hide her so that if she was ever found there would be no evidence of who had done it and it would be the perfect crime."

DeBardeleben was arrested in 1966 for kidnapping and sodomising a young girl, a crime he committed with Davis's male cousin. This was DeBardeleben's first known sex offence. But after the jury discovered that the victim had gotten into the car with the two men voluntarily, the charges were ultimately withdrawn. Two times within a short period of time, Davis fell pregnant with DeBardeleben's child; the first pregnancy ended in a miscarriage after DeBardeleben shoved her down a flight of stairs. They were already divorced when she gave birth to his daughter, Lindsey.

When he married Caryn, his fourth wife, she was twelve years his junior. She was a high school student and was 17-years-old. When Secret Service agents searched DeBardeleben's home after his first arrest for counterfeiting in 1976, they discovered a printing press, as well as a collection of dildos, whips, vibrators, and a stack of five-by-seven cards containing the names, addresses, measurements, and physical characteristics of numerous women. His house had amateur sadomasochistic pornography all over the walls. Evidence found led to him being convicted and sentenced to the Federal Penitentiary in Danbury, Connecticut where DeBardeleben's intelligence quotient was determined to be approximately 127.

During his imprisonment DeBardeleben wrote; "I feel that I have been unjustly tormented, degraded and shit upon by society (specifically the American Justice System-which is rotten to the core). In order to regain an adequate self-image, I feel compelled to somehow restore my self-respect. If I were to shit upon society for an adequate monetary gain, commensurate with the pan I have suffered and not get caught, it would accomplish my objective." In 1978, after spending time at a halfway house, DeBardeleben moved to Arlington, Virginia, where he purchased a 1977 Ford Thunderbird to resume his criminal activity. At the same time, a misunderstanding at the Crime Information Center led authorities to conclude that DeBardeleben had recently died.

Crimes
From 1979 to 1983, the United States Secret Service believed they had found a geographical pattern to a string of counterfeiting cases and were tracking the distribution of counterfeit $20 bills across thirty-eight states. The Secret Service started receiving allegations of bogus $20 bills being circulated in eastern states in 1979 from bank tellers and store owners. All of the notes had the same flaws, which suggested that they all came from the same source. The counterfeiter, known as the "Mall Passer," would use the fake money to pay for a cheap item and pocket the change for a profit. The authorities distributed composite sketches to store clerks in 1982, when the offender was earning $130,000 year, based on their projections of his future behaviour. If this person handed the staff a $20 bill, they were told to call the police. This led to DeBardeleben's arrest at Maryville, Tennessee. In DeBardeleben's car more counterfeit $20 bills were found, each labelled with the city in which they would be passed. Also, DeBardeleben's driver’s license read Roger Blanchard, but the car he had left at the mall was registered to James Jones so the authorities had to use fingerprints to positively identify him.

Following a thorough search of DeBardeleben's home, a storage unit that DeBardeleben used was located using a folded white piece of paper that was designated in the yellow pages which contained information on a storage unit. The storage facility was then quickly searched for fake printing plates. Photographs showing women being raped and killed were discovered while authorities were looking for the tools DeBardeleben used to make the notes. A death kit including handcuffs, shoelaces, chains, whips, and K-Y jelly was also discovered, along with sets of women's underwear, homemade audiotapes of rape and torture, and sets of women's underwear. FBI profilers speculated that in photographs where his face was seen along with the victim's, he murdered the woman and disposed of her body; whereas in photographs where he was hiding his face, he allowed the victim to live. Most of the forty different women identified in his photograph collection have never been identified. Debardeleben recorded torturing one victim as he pressed a burning cigar against her back, in which he stated; “Describe the pain, how does it hurt? Just exactly how does it hurt? I want you to tell me that you’re fascinated by the pain.“ The victim being tortured was ultimately identified as 20-year-old Laurie Jensen.

DeBardeleben appeared in court on his own behalf, and during cross-examination he made one of his victims sit through an audio recording of his abuse. Debardeleben also accidentally implicated himself when he described the car and the incident in great detail while questioning the woman about being pulled into the car by her attacker. He was found guilty of several offences and given a cumulative sentence of 375 years in federal prison. On January 26, 2011, DeBardeleben died of pneumonia at the Federal Medical Center in North Carolina.

In personality, DeBardeleben displayed marked schizoid and narcissistic traits, along with the symptoms of psychopathy. He also exemplified all eight of the outdated DSM-III-R criteria for sadistic personality disorder. DeBardeleben was characterized as having a 'Jekyll and Hyde' personality, whose demeanor could shift from affable to extremely cruel. The DSM-IV cites DeBardeleben as an example of both sexual sadism and antisocial personality disorder.

Alleged victims 
The precise number of DeBardeleben's victims will never be known. DeBardeleben steadfastly resisted admitting guilt and refrained from boasting about any of his crimes. However, according to the Secret Service, he likely had been abusing women for eighteen years before his apprehension. DeBardeleben would often approach his victims while pretending to be a police officer during his reported sexual attacks. He would regularly rape his victims in a sadistic manner when he had them under his control, frequently sticking foreign items into their bodies as a result of his erection difficulties. During the assaults, he would also make his victims call him "Daddy," and he would record the incidents. The following are individuals who authorities strongly suspect were likely victims of DeBardeleben:
 Edna Terry McDonald (52) - 5/6/1971 (charged but not tried): The 52-year-old realtor left her office to travel to Barrington, Rhode Island for an evening meeting with a "Mr. Peter Morgan." When she did not come home, a search was launched. She was discovered dead and hanging from a basement rafter the following day in the house she had been showing. There was no indication of robbery or rape as a motive; instead, she had been strangled with her stockings. Until a comparable crime was connected to Debardeleben years later, police had no leads at all. 
 Lucy Alexander (19) - 9/3/1978; Georgetown, Delaware: Lucy Alexander, a 19-year-old nursing student, was kidnapped by Debardeleben. He subjected her to multiple acts of rape and sodomy, made her perform fellatio on him, and the following day in Delaware, released her in a remote location.
 Elizabeth Mason  (31) - 2/4/1979: The 31-year-old realtor agreed to show a man numerous residences in Fayetteville, North Carolina. He took out a gun and started pistol-whipping Mason inside one of the homes they had been touring. He smashed her skull against the floor, strangled her, and tied her up until she passed out. She discovered the stranger had taken her car and underwear when she awoke. She had not been sexually attacked despite being partially undressed.
 Laurie Jensen (20) - 6/1/1979; Ocean City, Maryland: In July 1979, Laurie Jensen was returning home at night after working at a convenience shop when a car with a flashing light drew up next to her. She was requested to get in the car when the driver produced his identification. She was questioned about a robbery by the driver, who was dressed as a police officer. She was handcuffed when he unexpectedly seized her arm. She was taken to a house two hours away while wearing a blindfold. She was subjected to rape and violence for three days while also being locked in a closet. She constantly noticed that her kidnapper was naked except from a rudimentary hood with eye openings. He took pictures of her and recorded her being tortured, forcing her to tell him how much she was enjoying it. After three days he drove her back and released her alive.
 Dianne Overton (25) - 11/1/1980: Debardeleben pulled over Diane Overton, a lone driver, on November 1 at 4 a.m. while posing as a police officer on a quiet residential road. When he tried to rape her, Overton bit his hand and yelled for help. She kicked the gear stick of his car as he attempted to force her into his vehicle, stopping the engine. Debardeleben jumped into the driver's seat and repeatedly tried to run her over before eventually giving up.
 Maria Santini (27) - 11/12/1980: Debardeleben entered a clothing store and approached Maria Santini, the cashier, brandishing a revolver. She had to hunch over in the footwell of his car as he drove her to his house after carrying her outside. He hogtied her there, took pictures of her, and then raped her. Santini was then taken to a wilderness region and released.
 Jean McPhaul (37) - 4/27/1982; (charged but not tried): A prominent realtor from Bossier City, Louisiana, McPhaul vanished after accompanying a "Dr. Zack" to view a property. She was found hanging from a rafter in the attic the following morning. She had not been raped, but she had been stabbed twice in the chest and strangled. A neighbour had seen "Dr. Zack" arrive at the residence and provided police with enough information to create a composite sketch that appeared to closely resemble Debardeleben. A list of aliases Debardeleben planned to use for his illegal activities, including the moniker "Dr. Zack," was found in his private diary entries.
 Kellie Marie Brownlee (17) - 05/20/1982; Novi, Michigan: When Brownlee moved out of her family's house due to issues with her abusive stepfather in May 1982, she was lodging with her boyfriend and his family in their apartment in Walled Lake, Michigan. On May 20, 1982, Kellie and her boyfriend took the bus to their high school, but Kellie skipped classes and subsequently hitchhiked to the Twelve Oaks Mall in Novi, Michigan, where she made multiple job applications. At the mall, a friend's mother spotted her and offered to drive her home, but Kellie turned down the offer. She was last seen at this location, and DeBardeleben has been accused of being involved in her disappearance. Debardeleben reportedly preferred hitchhikers and brunette women, both of which matched Kellie's description. Brownlee's mother was provided with photos belonging to DeBardeleben in an effort to help identify Kellie, but she was unsuccessful. Since then, DeBardeleben has been ruled out as a suspect.
 Joe Rapini (42) and David Starr (42) - 4/13/1983; Greece, New York: When David Starr and Joe Rapini returned home from work at a local Columbia Savings Bank in Greece, Rochester, they discovered a masked burglar holding them at gunpoint. He kidnapped Rapini and demanded that Starr visit a bank to get a $70,000 ransom. Starr proposed the first half of the ransom and was instructed to leave it next to a burned-out building. The ransom was later collected by a woman driving a white automobile, which suggested that Debardeleben's may have had accomplices help him commit some his crimes. Even though Starr did everything he could to follow his orders, Rapini was found shot to death in his car later that day. Despite disparities in Debardeleben’s normal modus operandi, he was linked to this case by his journal entries.

See also 
 List of serial killers in the United States

References

External links
 First chapter of Stephen Michaud's book Lethal Shadow, about DeBardeleben

1940 births
2011 deaths
American counterfeiters
American rapists
American people who died in prison custody
Deaths from pneumonia in North Carolina
People from Little Rock, Arkansas
People with antisocial personality disorder
People with sadistic personality disorder
People with sexual sadism disorder
Prisoners who died in United States federal government detention
Suspected serial killers